Heteria is a genus of parasitic flies in the family Tachinidae. There are about six described species in Heteria.

Species
These six species belong to the genus Heteria:
 Heteria appendiculata Malloch, 1930
 Heteria atripes Malloch, 1930
 Heteria extensa Malloch, 1930
 Heteria flavibasis Malloch, 1930
 Heteria plebia Malloch, 1930
 Heteria punctigera Malloch, 1930

References

Further reading

 
 
 
 

Tachinidae
Articles created by Qbugbot